In medicine, a side effect is an effect, whether therapeutic or adverse, that is secondary to the one intended; although the term is predominantly employed to describe adverse effects, it can also apply to beneficial, but unintended, consequences of the use of a drug. Developing drugs is a complicated process, because no two people are exactly the same, so even drugs that have virtually no side effects, might be difficult for some people. Also, it is difficult to make a drug that targets one part of the body but that does not affect other parts, the fact that increases the risk of side effects in the untargeted parts.

Occasionally, drugs are prescribed or procedures performed specifically for their side effects; in that case, said side effect ceases to be a side effect and is now an intended effect.  For instance, X-rays were historically (and are currently) used as an imaging technique; the discovery of their oncolytic capability led to their employ in radiotherapy (ablation of malignant tumours).

Frequency of side effects 
The World Health Organization and other health organisations characterise the probability or chance of experiencing side effects as:
 Very common, ≥ 1⁄10
 Common (frequent), 1⁄10 to 1⁄100
 Uncommon (infrequent), 1⁄100 to 1⁄1000
 Rare, 1⁄1000 to 1⁄10000
 Very rare, < 1⁄10000
The European Commission recommends that the list should contain only effects where "at least a reasonable possibility" exists that it is caused by the drug and the frequency "should represent crude incidence rates (and not differences or relative risks calculated against placebo or other comparator)". That is, the frequency describes how often symptoms appear after taking the drug, not caused by the drug. Both health care providers and lay people misinterpret the frequency of side effects as describing the increase in frequency caused by the drug.

Examples of therapeutic side effects

 Bevacizumab (Avastin), used to slow the growth of blood vessels, has been used against dry age-related macular degeneration, as well as macular edema from diseases such as diabetic retinopathy and central retinal vein occlusion.
Buprenorphine has been shown experimentally (1982–1995) to be effective against severe, refractory depression.
 Bupropion (Wellbutrin), an anti-depressant, is also used as a smoking cessation aid; this indication was later approved, and the name of the smoking cessation product is Zyban. In Ontario, Canada, smoking cessation drugs are not covered by provincial drug plans; elsewhere, Zyban is priced higher than Wellbutrin, despite being the same drug. Therefore, some physicians prescribe Wellbutrin for both indications.
 Carbamazepine is an approved treatment for bipolar disorder and epileptic seizures, but it has side effects useful in treating attention-deficit hyperactivity disorder (ADHD), schizophrenia, phantom limb syndrome, paroxysmal extreme pain disorder, neuromyotonia, and post-traumatic stress disorder.
 Dexamethasone and betamethasone in premature labor, to enhance pulmonary maturation of the fetus.
 Doxepin has been used to treat angioedema and severe allergic reactions due to its strong antihistamine properties.
 Gabapentin, approved for treatment of seizures and postherpetic neuralgia in adults, has side-effects which are useful in treating bipolar disorder1, essential tremor, hot flashes, migraine prophylaxis, neuropathic pain syndromes, phantom limb syndrome, and restless leg syndrome.
 Hydroxyzine, an antihistamine, is also used as an anxiolytic.
 Magnesium sulfate in obstetrics for premature labor and preeclampsia.
 Methotrexate (MTX), approved for the treatment of choriocarcinoma, is frequently used for the medical treatment of an unruptured ectopic pregnancy.
 The SSRI medication sertraline is approved as an antidepressant but delays conjugal climax in men, and thus may be supplied to those in which climax is premature.
 Sildenafil was originally intended for pulmonary hypertension; subsequently, it was discovered that it also produces erections, for which it was later marketed.
 Terazosin, an α1-adrenergic antagonist approved to treat benign prostatic hyperplasia (enlarged prostate) and hypertension, is (one of several drugs) used off-label to treat drug induced diaphoresis and hyperhidrosis (excessive sweating).

Examples of undesirable/unwanted side effects

 Echinacea – more than 20 different types of reactions have been reported, including asthma attacks, loss of pregnancy, hives, swelling, aching muscles and gastrointestinal upsets.
 Feverfew – pregnant women should avoid using this herb, as it can trigger uterine contractions which could lead to premature labour or miscarriage.
 Asteraceae plants – which include feverfew, echinacea, dandelion and chamomile. Side effects include allergic dermatitis and hay fever.

See also 
 Paradoxical reaction, an effect of a substance opposite to what would usually be expected.
 Pharmacogenetics, the use of genetic information to determine which type of drugs will work best for a patient

References

External links 
 
 

Clinical pharmacology
de